Events from the year 1807 in Ireland.

Events
March – Sir Arthur Wellesley is appointed Chief Secretary for Ireland.
18 May – exiled Irish rebel Michael Dwyer is acquitted of a charge of conspiring to mount an Irish insurrection against British rule in New South Wales (Australia), but subsequently stripped of his free settler status.
20 November – sinking of the Rochdale and the Prince of Wales: The British troopships Rochdale (brig) and Prince of Wales (packet ship) sink in a storm in Dublin Bay with the loss of around 400 lives.

Arts and literature
Actor Edmund Kean plays leading parts in the Belfast theatre with Sarah Siddons.

Births
28 January – Robert McClure, Arctic explorer (died 1873).
7 March – John McCaul, educator, theologian, and the second president of the University of Toronto (died 1887).
10 March – James Fintan Lalor, revolutionary, journalist and writer (died 1849).
9 September – Richard Chenevix Trench, né Richard Trench, Archbishop of Dublin (Church of Ireland) (died 1886).
27 September – John T. Mullock, Roman Catholic Bishop of St. John's, Newfoundland (died 1869).
23 October – Baroness Tautphoeus, née Jemima Montgomery, novelist (died 1893).
14 December – Francis Hincks, politician in Canada (died 1885).
Full date unknown
Robert Cane, doctor, member of the Repeal Association and the Irish Confederation, Mayor of Kilkenny (died 1858).
Thomas Henry, police magistrate in London (died 1876).

Deaths
8 February – Dorcas Blackwood, 1st Baroness Dufferin and Claneboye (born 1726).
5 June – Boyle Roche, politician (born 1736).
Nathaniel Grogan, painter (born 1740).
Elizabeth Sugrue, hangwoman (born 1740s)

References

 
Years of the 19th century in Ireland
1800s in Ireland
Ireland
 Ireland